Septimus Brutton (26 July 1869 – 29 September 1933) was an English cricketer. Brutton was a right-handed batsman. He was born at Tynemouth, Northumberland. The son of Thomas Brutton, the Vicar and Rural Dean of Tynemouth, and Saran Ann, Brutton was one of nine children. A notable sibling was his brother Ernest, who himself would play first-class cricket and play international rugby for England. Brutton was educated at St John's School, Leatherhead between 1880 and 1885.

Having first been recorded as playing cricket for a side representative of Northumberland as early as 1887, Brutton made his debut for Northumberland in the 1896 Minor Counties Championship against Northamptonshire. He appeared again the following season against Durham, before his next appearances in the 1901 season. Brutton made four appearances in that season, the last of which came against Durham. Later in 1904, Brutton made a single first-class appearance for Hampshire against Yorkshire at the United Services Recreation Ground, Portsmouth. Yorkshire made 549 in their first-innings, in response Hampshire were dismissed for 331, with Brutton himself scoring 15 runs before he was dismissed by George Hirst. Hampshire were forced to follow-on, with Brutton scoring 7 runs before he was dismissed by Schofield Haigh, with Hampshire being dismissed for 200 to lose the match by an innings and 18 runs. This was his only major appearance for Hampshire.

Brutton married Eleanor Jane Phipps on 1 September 1896 at Wakefield, Yorkshire, with the couple having two children: Charles who played first-class cricket for Hampshire on 81 occasions, and Guy, who later became a solicitor. Brutton himself was also a solicitor, following his move to Portsmouth from Northumberland, he was a partner in the solicitors firm Hobbs and Brutton by 1903. The partnership between Brutton and Edward Hobbs, which had premises at 144 High Street, Portsmouth, and The Square, Petersfield, lasted until 1914, when Hobbs retired from the firm. Brutton continued with the business under the same name. He continued as a solicitor until at least 1929. Brutton's wife died on 15 June 1931, with Brutton dying at Marylebone, London on 29 September 1933. His law firm was later taken over by his son Guy, who ran the firm until 1940.

References

External links

1869 births
1933 deaths
Cricketers from Tynemouth
English cricketers
English solicitors
Hampshire cricketers
Northumberland cricketers
People educated at St John's School, Leatherhead